Dorylaeum or Dorylaion was an ancient city in Anatolia. It is now an archaeological site located near the city of Eskişehir, Turkey.

Its original location was about 10 km southwest of Eskişehir, at a place now known as Karaca Hisar; about the end of the fourth century B.C. it was moved to a location north of modern Eskişehir.

History 
The city existed under the Phrygians but may have been much older.
 
It was a Roman trading post. It also was probably a key city of the route the Apostle Paul took on his Second Missionary Voyage in 50 AD. It became a bishopric when part of the Late Roman province of Phrygia Salutaris.

In the third century AD, it was threatened by Gothic raids. The Roman army that was based in Asia minor was spread thin, and the navy had moved west from the Northern city of Sinope, therefore the provincials were left exposed. These Goths came from the trans-danubian region on the black sea. When the city was under threat, the people used dedicatory statues to build their wall quicker, indicating their rush to protect themselves against the invaders. (see Mitchell - crisis and continuity (1993) page 236)

After the Battle of Manzikert in 1071 it was taken by the Seljuk Turks.

Dorylaeum was the site of two battles during the crusades. In 1097, during the First Crusade, the crusaders defeated the Seljuks there, in their first major victory. During the Second Crusade it was the site of a major crusader defeat, which effectively ended the German contribution to the crusade.

Byzantine emperor Manuel I Comnenus fortified Dorylaeum in 1175.The contemporary Byzantine historian Niketas Choniates relates that Manuel did not destroy the fortifications of Dorylaeum, as he had agreed to do as part of the treaty he negotiated with the Seljuk Turkish sultan Kilij Arslan II immediately after the Battle of Myriokephalon. The sultan's response to this development was not a direct attack on Dorylaeum but the dispatch of a large army to ravage the rich Meander valley to the south.

Dorylaeum was described by the Muslim author al-Harawi (died 1215) as a place of medicinal hot springs on the frontier at the end of Christian territory.

Ecclesiastical history 
Dorylaeum became a bishopric under the Byzantine Empire and was a suffragan the Metropolitan of Synnada in Phrygia.

Seven bishops are known from the fourth to the ninth century, the most famous being Eusebius. The see is mentioned as late as the twelfth century among the suffragans of Synnada, but must have been suppressed soon after.

Titular see 
Dorylaeum is included in the Catholic Church's list of titular sees.
The diocese was nominally restored as a Latin Catholic titular bishopric in 1715 as Dorylæum (Dorylaeum), which is spelled Dorylaëum since 1925.

It is vacant since decades, having had had the following incumbents, all of the lowest (episcopal) rank :
 Johann Hugo von Gärtz (1715.02.07 – 1716.12.25)
 Louis-Philippe-François Mariauchau d’Esglis (1772.01.22 – 1784.12.02)
 Johann Nepomuk von Wolf (1788.12.15 – 1818.04.06)
 Mykhaylo Bradach (1808.09.30 – 1815.12.20)
 Stephanus d’Elia (1818.05.25 – ?)
 Johann Friedrich Oesterreicher (1823.11.17 – 1825.06.26)
 Matthias Terrazas (1827.05.21 – ?)
 John Baptist Salpointe (1868.09.25 – 1884.04.22),  as Apostolic Vicar of Arizona (USA) (1868.09.25 – 1884.04.22); later Titular Archbishop of Anazarbus (1884.04.22 – 1885.08.18) & Coadjutor Archbishop of Santa Fe (USA) (1884.04.22 – 1885.08.18), succeeding as Metropolitan Archbishop of Santa Fe (1885.08.18 – 1894.01.07), emeritus as Titular Archbishop of Constantia antea Tomi (1894.01.21 – 1898.07.15)
 Antoine-Marie-Hippolyte Carrie, Holy Ghost Fathers (C.S.Sp.) (1886.06.08 – 1904.10.13)
 Antanas Karosas (Antoni Karaś) (1906.11.08 – 1910.04.07)
 Fulgentius Torres, Subiaco Cassinese Benedictine Congregation (O.S.B. Subl.) (1910.05.10 – 1914.10.05)
 Juan Bautista Luis y Pérez (1915.02.22 – 1921.11.30)
 Michele de Jorio (1921.12.01 – 1922.04.04)
 Benvenuto Diego Alonso y Nistal, Capuchin Franciscans (O.F.M. Cap.) (1923.11.27 – 1938.05.23)
 Gherardo Sante Menegazzi, O.F.M. Cap. (1938.07.01 – 1938.10.20), as emeritus Bishop of Comacchio (Italy) (1920.12.16 – 1938.07.01), later Titular Archbishop of Pompeiopolis in Paphlagonia (1938.10.20 – death 1945.01.21)
 Lorenz Zeller, Benedictine Order (O.S.B.) (1939.01.07 – 1945.09.01)
 Joseph Wilhelmus Maria Baeten (1945.11.30 – 1951.02.18) as Coadjutor Bishop of Breda (Netherlands) (1945.11.30 – 1951.02.18), succeeded as Bishop of Breda (1951.02.18 – 1961.09.08), emeritus as Titular Archbishop of Stauropolis (1961.09.08 – 1964.08.26)
 Henri-Charles Dupont (1951.07.24 – 1972.12.06)

See also 
 List of ancient Greek cities
 Battle of Dorylaeum (1097)
 Battle of Dorylaeum (1147)
Karacahisar Castle

Notes

References 
 Lindner, R.P., (2007) Explorations in Ottoman Prehistory, Published by University of Michigan Press.

Sources and external links
 GigaCatholic, with titular incumbent biography links

Catholic titular sees in Asia
Crusade places
Archaeological sites in Central Anatolia
Roman towns and cities in Turkey
Former populated places in Turkey
Populated places of the Byzantine Empire
History of Eskişehir Province
Populated places in Phrygia